Holorusia is a genus of true crane fly, including the largest known crane fly species, Holorusia mikado.

Biology
The larvae are aquatic.

Distribution
Asia & Australasia.

Species

H. aberrans (Alexander, 1920)
H. agni Alexander, 1971
H. albicostigma (Alexander, 1950)
H. albovittata (Macquart, 1838)
H. andrewsi (Edwards, 1932)
H. astarte (Alexander, 1949)
H. basiflava Yang & Yang, 1993
H. bioculata (Alexander, 1967)
H. bitruncata (Alexander, 1950)
H. borneensis (Brunetti, 1918)
H. bourbonica (Alexander, 1957)
H. brobdignagia (Westwood, 1876)
H. calliergon (Alexander, 1940)
H. carmichaeli (Brunetti, 1913)
H. castanea (Macquart, 1838)
H. cerbereana (Alexander, 1942)
H. clavipes (Edwards, 1921)
H. conspicabilis Skuse, 1890
H. cressida (Alexander, 1953)
H. damuda Evenhuis, 2006
H. degeneri Alexander, 1978
H. dives (Brunetti, 1912)
H. dohrniana (Enderlein, 1912)
H. dorsopleuralis (Alexander, 1957)
H. dravidica (Edwards, 1932)
H. elobata (Alexander, 1967)
H. esakii (Takahashi, 1960)
H. festivipennis (Edwards, 1933)
H. fijiensis (Alexander, 1921)
H. flava (Brunetti, 1911)
H. flavoides (Brunetti, 1918)
H. fulvipes (Edwards, 1921)
H. fulvolateralis (Brunetti, 1911)
H. glebosa Alexander, 1971
H. globulicornis (Alexander, 1935)
H. goliath (Alexander, 1941)
H. hainanensis Yang & Yang, 1997
H. hansoni (Alexander, 1963)
H. henana Yang, 1999
H. herculeana (Alexander, 1941)
H. hespera Arnaud & Byers, 1990
H. ignicaudata (Alexander, 1935)
H. illex (Alexander, 1947)
H. impictipleura (Alexander, 1957)
H. inclyta (Alexander, 1949)
H. incurvata Yang & Yang, 1993
H. inventa (Walker, 1848)
H. japvoensis (Alexander, 1953)
H. lacunosa Alexander, 1971
H. laticellula (Alexander, 1949)
H. lepida (Alexander, 1924)
H. leptostylus (Alexander, 1963)
H. liberta (Alexander, 1935)
H. lieftincki (Edwards, 1932)
H. lineaticeps (Edwards, 1932)
H. lombokensis (Alexander, 1942)
H. luteistigmata (Alexander, 1963)
H. majestica (Brunetti, 1911)
H. makara (Alexander, 1967)
H. malayensis (Edwards, 1932)
H. mamare Evenhuis, 2006
H. mara (Alexander, 1953)
H. mikado (Westwood, 1876)
H. mitra Alexander, 1969
H. molybros (Alexander, 1957)
H. monochroa (Wiedemann, 1828)
H. nagana (Alexander, 1953)
H. nampoina (Alexander, 1963)
H. nigricauda (Edwards, 1925)
H. nigrofemorata (Alexander, 1967)
H. nimba (Alexander, 1936)
H. nirvana (Alexander, 1961)
H. novaeguineae (de Meijere, 1913)
H. nudicaudata (Edwards, 1932)
H. ochripes (Brunetti, 1911)
H. oosterbroeki Yang & Yang, 1997
H. ornatithorax (Brunetti, 1911)
H. palauensis (Alexander, 1940)
H. pallescens (Edwards, 1926)
H. pallifrons (Edwards, 1932)
H. pauliani (Alexander, 1955)
H. penumbrina (Edwards, 1919)
H. percontracta (Alexander, 1947)
H. perobtusa (Alexander, 1961)
H. persessilis (Alexander, 1941)
H. picturata Evenhuis, 2006
H. pluto (Brunetti, 1911)
H. praepotens (Wiedemann, 1828)
H. punctifrons (Rondani, 1875)
H. punctipennis (Edwards, 1926)
H. quadrifasciculata (Alexander, 1935)
H. quathlambica (Alexander, 1956)
H. radama (Alexander, 1963)
H. rector (Edwards, 1926)
H. regia (Alexander, 1935)
H. rex (Alexander, 1917)
H. rogeziana (Alexander, 1955)
H. sakarahana (Alexander, 1960)
H. schlingeri Evenhuis, 2006
H. similis (Edwards, 1921)
H. simplicitarsis (Alexander, 1963)
H. siva (Alexander, 1950)
H. sordidithorax (Alexander, 1953)
H. striaticeps (Alexander, 1957)
H. sufflava (Alexander, 1957)
H. umbrina (Wiedemann, 1828)
H. vanewrighti Alexander, 1971
H. viettei (Alexander, 1957)
H. vinsoniana (Alexander, 1956)
H. vishnu Alexander, 1971
H. walkeriana (Alexander, 1924)
H. yama Alexander, 1969

References

Tipulidae
Diptera of Asia
Diptera of Australasia
Taxa named by Hermann Loew